The New Leave It to Beaver (also known as Still the Beaver) is an American sitcom sequel to the original 1957–1963 sitcom Leave It to Beaver. The series began with the 1983 reunion television movie Still the Beaver that aired on CBS in March 1983.
The success of the television movie prompted the creation of a revival series, also titled Still the Beaver, that aired on The Disney Channel from 1984 to 1985. In 1986, the series was picked up by TBS, where it aired until June 1989.

Synopsis
The series focuses on Wally Cleaver (Tony Dow) and his younger brother, Theodore "Beaver" Cleaver (Jerry Mathers) as adults and with families of their own. Beaver is divorced and living with his mother, the widowed June Cleaver (Barbara Billingsley), along with his two sons, Kip and Oliver. Wally Cleaver lives next door with his wife Mary Ellen, his daughter Kelly and later, his son Kevin. Hugh Beaumont, who played Ward Cleaver in the original series, had died in 1982, a year prior to the premiere of the telemovie. His character, Ward, died in 1977. The 1983 telemovie is dedicated in Beaumont's memory.

Other series regulars included Wally's old friend Eddie Haskell (Ken Osmond), his wife Gert (Ellen Maxted) and their sons Freddie and Bomber (played by Osmond's two real-life sons), as well as "Lumpy" Rutherford (Frank Bank) and his daughter J.J., with Diane Brewster returning for four episodes to recreate her role as "Miss Canfield," Beaver's original grade school teacher. Some of Beaver's old friends, Larry Mondello (Rusty Stevens), and Richard Rickover (Rich Correll), return to the series.

Cast

 Barbara Billingsley as June Cleaver
 Tony Dow as Wally Cleaver
 Jerry Mathers as Theodore "Beaver" Cleaver
 Ken Osmond as Eddie Haskell
 Frank Bank as Clarance "Lumpy" Rutherford
 Kipp Marcus as Ward "Kip" Cleaver II
 John Snee as Oliver "Olly" Cleaver
 Kaleena Kiff as Kelly Cleaver
 Eric Osmond as Freddie Haskell
 Janice Kent as Mary Ellen Cleaver (née Rogers)
 Ellen Maxted as Gertrude "Gert" Haskell
 Christian Osmond as Eddie "Bomber" Haskell Jr.
 Giovanni Ribisi as Duffy Guthrie
 Diane Brewster as Miss Canfield
 Rusty Stevens as Larry Mondello 
 Rich Correll as Richard Rickover
 Troy Davidson as Kevin Cleaver (seasons 3–4)

Episodes

Still the Beaver

Television movie / repackaged as pilot
Still the Beaver, a two-hour CBS television movie, aired on March 19, 1983.

In addition to the cast of the subsequent sequel series, the television movie featured:
 Richard Deacon as Fred Rutherford, the Beaver's new employer
 reprising his role as Ward Cleaver's co-worker in the original series
 Ed Begley Jr. as Hubert "Whitey" Whitney, the Beaver's childhood friend
 in the original series, Whitey was played by Stanley Fafara
 Corey Feldman as Corey Cleaver, the Beaver's older son
 in the new series, this character became Ward "Kip" Cleaver II, played by Kipp Marcus
 Joanna Gleason as Kimberly, the soon to be ex-wife of the Beaver
 Tiger Fafara as Tooey Brown, Wally's childhood friend
 credited as Luke Fafara, reprising his role from the original series
 Diane Brewster as Miss Canfield, Beaver's second-grade teacher, now the principal of Grant Avenue School
It was dedicated in memory of Hugh Beaumont.
The original airing of the film easily won its Saturday night timeslot, and ranked 19th out of 66 programs airing that week, bringing in an 18.9 rating and a 33 share.

The first season, which aired on The Disney Channel, used the television movie’s title, Still the Beaver, as the series title. When the series moved to TBS for season two, the television movie was repackaged into four 30-minute "pilot" episodes as part of the renamed The New Leave It to Beaver series.  These were referred to as "special episodes" in an added voice-over by Barbara Billingsley and were known as:
 "Still the Beaver: Part I"
 "Still the Beaver: Part II"
 "Still the Beaver: Part III"
 "Still the Beaver: Part IV"

Season 1: 1984–85
This season aired on The Disney Channel as Still the Beaver. The season was split into two halves, and could be considered as two separate seasons. Most of the episodes during the second half of the season, which begins with "Escape from the Salt Mines", aired during the summer and fall of 1985, which is technically within the span of the 198586 TV season. The episode "Dear Pen Pal II" was produced to be The Disney Channel's series finale and features only clips from Season One, but did not actually air until the third season on TBS.

The New Leave It to Beaver

Season 2: 1986–87
From this season onward, the show aired on TBS as The New Leave It to Beaver.

Season 3: 1987–88

Season 4: 1988–89

Awards and nominations

See also
List of television series revivals

References

External links
 (television movie)

1980s American sitcoms
1984 American television series debuts
1989 American television series endings
American sequel television series
American television series revived after cancellation
Disney Channel original programming
English-language television shows
Leave It to Beaver
TBS (American TV channel) original programming
Television series about brothers
Television series about families
Television series by Universal Television